Projection, projections or projective may refer to:

Physics 
 Projection (physics), the action/process of light, heat, or sound reflecting from a surface to another in a different direction
 The display of images by a projector

Optics, graphics, and cartography 
 Map projection, reducing the surface of a three-dimensional planet to a flat map 
 Graphical projection, the production of a two-dimensional image of a three-dimensional object

Chemistry
 Fischer projection, a two-dimensional representation of a three-dimensional organic molecule
 Haworth projection, a way of writing a structural formula to represent the cyclic structure of monosaccharides 
 Natta projection, a way to depict molecules with complete stereochemistry in two dimensions in a skeletal formula
 Newman projection, a visual representation of a chemical bond from front to back

Mathematics
 Projection (mathematics), any of several different types of geometrical mappings
 Projection (linear algebra), a linear transformation  from a vector space to itself such that 
 Projection (set theory), one of two closely related types of functions or operations in set theory
 Projection (measure theory), use of a projection map in measure theory
 3D projection, any method of mapping three-dimensional points to a two-dimensional plane
 Vector projection, orthogonal projection of a vector onto a straight line
 Projection (relational algebra), a type of unary operation in relational algebra
 Projective geometry, the study of geometric properties that are invariant with respect to projective transformations
 Projective module, a generalization of a free module
 Projective object, a further generalization, in category theory
 Projection method (fluid dynamics), means of numerically solving time-dependent incompressible fluid-flow problems

Biology
 Projection areas, areas of the brain where sensory processing occurs
 Projection fiber, in neuroscience, white matter fibers that connect the cortex to the lower parts of the brain or the spinal cord

Linguistics 
 Projection (linguistics), grammatical trait inheritance from a head to a phrasal category
 Projection principle in syntax
 Projection of presuppositions in linguistics

Arts and entertainment
 "Projections" (Star Trek: Voyager), an episode of the television series Star Trek: Voyager
 Projections (The Blues Project album), 1966
 Projections (John Handy album), 1968
 Projections (film), 2013 Croatian film

Other uses
 Projection (alchemy), process in Alchemy
 Projections (journal), an interdisciplinary academic journal related to cinema and visual media
 Power projection, the capacity of a state to implement policy by means of force, or the threat thereof
 Psychological projection, or "Freudian projection", a defense mechanism in which one attributes to others one's own unacceptable or unwanted attributes, thoughts, or emotions
Social projection, a cognitive bias that leads people to believe others are similar to themselves
 Forecasting, making predictions of the future based on past and present data

See also
 
 
 Project (disambiguation)
 Projection effect (disambiguation)
 Projector (disambiguation)
 Projective (disambiguation)